Mauro Canali is a full professor of contemporary history at the University of Camerino in Italy. He is considered to be one of the most important scholars of the events leading to the crisis of the liberal Italian state and the rise of fascism. He has also researched and published extensively on the totalitarian structure of Mussolini's regime, its repressive mechanisms and its system of informants. He studied under Renzo De Felice, and has published in the Journal of Modern Italian Studies, the Italian dailies la Repubblica and Cronache di Liberal.

Career
Canali has participated in conferences and held seminars at European and American universities including the University of Copenhagen, University of Gothenburg, University of Barcelona, Harvard University, Brown University and the University of Massachusetts. From October through December 2006 he was a visiting scholar at Harvard University. He is frequently asked to contribute to and appear in history-related programs and documentaries on Italian TV such as "La Storia siamo noi", and is on the board of Rai Storia, the network's history channel. He consults for the program Res Gestae - persone, ricorrenze, eventi - an almanac of historical figures and events with a daily commentary called "100 seconds" that focuses on the most important historical events of the day.

L'informatore. Silone i comunisti e la polizia
His book, L'informatore. Silone i comunisti e la polizia, (coauthored with Dario Biocca), which bolstered the thesis of the collaboration between the well-known Abruzzi author Ignazio Silone and the Fascist political police during the 1920s, was the subject of much debate among historians in Italy and abroad. It was discussed in publications including New Left Review, The New Yorker, and The Nation.

Honors and awards
In 1998 Canali was awarded the Walter Tobagi Prize for his book Il delitto Matteotti. Affarismo e politica nel primo governo Mussolini. He was awarded the Bruno Buozzi Prize in 2005 for:  In 2010 ANPI awarded him with the Premio Renato Benedetto Fabrizi. In 2014, Canali was awarded the Premio Internazionale Capalbio for his book Il tradimento. Gramsci Togliatti e la verità negata. 
In 2017, he was awarded the Premio Fiuggi/Storia for his book La scoperta dell'Italia. Il fascismo raccontato dai corrispondenti americani.
He is now Advisor of the American Academy in Roma.

Publications 
La prima trasvolata atlantica in solitaria - RCS MediaGroup Corriere della Sera - 2021
Dalle Alpi al Deserto Libico. I diari di Rodolfo Graziani 1940-1941 - Nuova Argos - 2021.
All Bliss in Fiume. L'opinione pubblica statunitense di fronte all'impresa, in Fiume 1919-1920. Uno sguardo internazionale, Memoria e Ricerca. Rivista di Storia Contemporanea, n.3, settembre-dicembre 2020, Bologna, Il Mulino.
Il delitto Matteotti, Milano, RCS - Corriere della Sera, 2020.
La guerra di Etiopia e i corrispondenti di guerra americani, in Correspondants de guerre 1918-1939 Maroc - Ethiopie - Espagne, Presses Universitaires Savoie Mont Blanc Laboratoire LLSETI, 2020.
Mussolini e i ladri di regime. Gli arricchimenti illeciti del fascismo (con Clemente Volpini) - Mondadori - 2019
La scoperta dell'Italia. Il fascismo raccontato dai corrispondenti americani - Marsilio Editori - 2017 (Premio Fiuggi/Storia 2017)
Il tradimento. Gramsci Togliatti e la verità negata - Marsilio Editori - 2013 (Premio Internazionale Capalbio 2014)
Il revisionismo storico e il fascismo, in Cercles. Revista de Historia Cultural - Publicacions i Edicions Universitat de Barcelona - 2011
Mussolini and His Myths, in Sinnverlust und Sinnfindung am Anfang des 20. Jahrhunderts a.c. Karin Wolgast - Konigshausen & Neumann - 2011
Il problema dell'Altro nei regimi totalitari. Il caso del fascismo, in Cittadinanza, identità e diritti a.c. Giulio M. Salerno e Francesco Rimoli - EUM - 2011
Crime and Repression, in Oxford Handbook of Fascism a.c. Richard J. B. Bosworth - Oxford University Press - 2009 
Matteotti Murder and the Origins of Mussolini's Totalitarian Fascist Regime in Italy, in Journal of Modern Italian Studies - 2009 vol. 14
Repressione e consenso nell'esperimento fascista, in Modernità totalitaria. Il fascismo italiano a.c. di Emilio Gentile - Editori Laterza - 2008  
Guidonia e il regime fascista. Una 'città nuova' dagli anni del consenso alla guerra (1935-1945), in Innamorarsi del futuro. Guidonia Montecelio 1937-2007, Ancona, 2007.
Mussolini e il petrolio iracheno. L'Italia, gli interessi petroliferi e le grandi potenze - Einaudi - 2007
Il delitto Matteotti - Il Mulino - 1997, 2004, 2015.
Ignazio Silone and the Fascist political police, in Journal of Modern Italian Studies - 2001 vol.5
Il caso Silone. Le prove del doppio gioco - I libri della Fondazione Liberal - 2000
Le spie del regime - Il Mulino - 2004
 (con Dario Biocca), L' informatore: Silone, i comunisti e la polizia - Luni Editrice - 2000
Il dissidentismo fascista. Pisa e il caso Santini 1923-1925 - Bonacci - 1983
Il delitto Matteotti. Affarismo e politica nel primo governo Mussolini - Il Mulino - 1997
Cesare Rossi. Da rivoluzionario a eminenza grigia del fascismo - Il Mulino - 1991

Notes

References 

Il sistema dei partiti in Italia – Il Sessantotto e le donne - prof. Mauro Canali conferenza presso Presidenza del Consiglio dei ministri dipartimento pari opportunita'
Alain Charbonnier, Spie, delatori e polemiche, recensione su Gnosis, rivista del Sisde
Tutta la verità sul caso Tresca di Mauro Canali
 Editoriale di Mauro Canali a Rai Storia
 Intervista a Mauro Canali sugli sviluppi della ricerca storica
 presentazione Palazzo delle Esposizioni di Mauro Canali del suo libro 'Il tradimento. Gramsci Togliatti e la verità negata'
 Ignazio Silone and the Fascist Political Police

20th-century Italian historians
21st-century Italian historians
Academic staff of the University of Camerino